HMS Culloden was the second ship to bear the name.  She was built at Cleveland, Plymouth, as a storeship hoy and launched in December, 1749. 
She was sold on 16 December 1765.

References
 

Ships of the line of the Royal Navy
1749 ships